Ah King is a collection of short stories set in the Federated Malay States and elsewhere in Southeast Asia during the 1920s by W. Somerset Maugham. It was first published by the UK publishing house, Heinemann, in September 1933; the first American edition was published on November 8 of the same year by Doubleday Doran, New York. The book was published in French translation as La Femme dans la Jungle (1935) and in Spanish as Ah King, mi criado china (1946).

Like The Casuarina Tree, Ah King was loosely based on Maugham's experiences traveling with his companion Gerald Haxton in the region for six months in 1921 and four months in 1925. The short stories collected in both volumes had appeared previously in magazines.

Explanation of the title
In the preface to the collection, Maugham recounts how he engaged a servant in Singapore to assist him in his travels. Ah King, a twenty-year old man, accompanied him for six months. When Maugham was about to depart for Europe and the time came for them to part ways, Ah King surprised the author by bursting into tears (having shown little sign of emotion previously on the journey), leading Maugham to dedicate the volume to him.

Contents
The stories—
Footprints in the Jungle
The Door of Opportunity
The Vessel of Wrath
The Book-Bag
The Back of Beyond
Neil MacAdam

Note: The short story Neil MacAdam was dramatized for the stage in 1941 by Paulo Braga as O Fruito Proibido.

References

1933 short story collections
British short story collections
Short story collections by W. Somerset Maugham
Heinemann (publisher) books
Malaysia in fiction